Greenwood, California may refer to:

Greenwood, El Dorado County, California
Greenwood, Glenn County, California
Greenwood, California, former name of Elk, Mendocino County, California
Greenwood, Sonoma County, California, a former community near Sears Point